Hokkaidō 12th District (北海道第12区) is an electoral district for the House of Representatives, the lower house of the national Diet of Japan. The district was established in 1994 and had major boundary changes in 2002 and 2017.

Area

The 12th District is in northern Hokkaido. It covers the areas of Sōya Subprefecture and Okhotsk Subprefecture; this includes the cities of Kitami, Abashiri, Monbetsu, and Wakkanai. It occupies about one-sixth of the area of Hokkaido and is the largest constituency in the House of Representatives (14,740.93 km², the same as Iwate Prefecture).

In 2002, the Soya Branch Office was transferred to the 7th district of Hokkaido. In 2017, The town of Horonobe was moved from the 10th district to the 12th district.

List of representatives

Election results

References

Politics of Hokkaido
Districts of the House of Representatives (Japan)